Sphingomonas guangdongensis  is a Gram-negative bacteria from the genus of Sphingomonas which has been isolated from lead-zinc ore in Meizhou in the Guangdong province in China.

References

Further reading

External links
Type strain of Sphingomonas guangdongensis at BacDive -  the Bacterial Diversity Metadatabase

guangdongensis
Bacteria described in 2014